Agios Vasileios (also spelled Ayios Vasileios or Ayios Vasilios; Greek: Άγιος Βασίλειος) is the site of a Mycenaean palace, located near the village of Xerokambi in Laconia, Greece. It was discovered after a Linear B tablet was found accidentally on the slope of a hill, near the Byzantine chapel of Agios Vasileios (St. Basil), in 2008; two more tablet fragments were found in a survey conducted the same year. Excavations, carried out by the Archaeological Society of Athens and directed by archaeologist Adamantia Vasilogamvrou, began in 2009 and have brought to light a palace complex with a large central courtyard with colonnaded porticos along the sides. This palace was first constructed in the 17th-16th BCE, destroyed in the late 15th-early 14th century BCE, rebuilt, and finally destroyed again in the late 14th or early 13th century BCE. Finds include an archive of Linear B tablets, kept in a room adjacent to the colonnade; cult objects such as figurines made of clay and ivory; a collection of twenty bronze swords; and fragments of wall frescoes. The discovery of Agios Vasileios was chosen by the 2013 Shanghai Archaeology Forum as one of its 10 most important archaeological discoveries worldwide.

References 

Bronze Age sites in Greece
Mycenaean sites in the Peloponnese (region)
2000s archaeological discoveries